Mike Lucas (born March 7, 1959) is an American football coach.  From 2007 through the 2011 season he was the head football coach at Southeastern Louisiana University located in Hammond, Louisiana—the 14th football coach at the school. He was released from his duties as head coach at Southeastern Louisiana on November 21, 2011.

Personal life
In November 2008, Lucas underwent surgery which successfully repaired a heart valve.

Head coaching record

References

External links
 Northwestern State profile
 Indiana State profile

1959 births
Living people
Eastern New Mexico Greyhounds football coaches
Indiana State Sycamores football coaches
Louisiana Ragin' Cajuns football coaches
Liberty Flames football coaches
Northwestern State Demons football coaches
Sam Houston Bearkats football coaches
Southeastern Louisiana Lions football coaches
UTEP Miners football coaches
William & Mary Tribe football coaches
People from Burlington County, New Jersey